The AN/APQ-174 is an American Ku band radar used on military helicopters for navigation, particularly at low level.

It was developed during the late 1980s, as a derivative of the AN/APQ-168 and LANTIRN radars. It was initially procured in the early 1990s for a variety of platforms, including U.S. Army MH-47 Chinooks and MH-60s. The radar can be used for a variety of missions, including: combat search and rescue and special forces insertion and extraction.

This podded radar has a variety of modes, including terrain-following and terrain-avoidance, ground mapping, air-to-ground ranging, weather detection/tracking, navigation, beacon interrogation, cross scan modes and power management.

Angular scan times are 5.5º/sec and the weather mode is improved during heavy rain by the use of circular polarization.

See also
List of radars

References
 
Airborne Radar Handbook , 200 4 page 271/272, published by the National Defense Industry Publishing Co, 23 Zi Zu Yilan South Road, Hai Ding Chu, Beijing, China
Jane's Avionics Yearbook 1991/92 page 92;  Jane's Avionics Yearbook 2004/05 page 627.

Aircraft radars
Military radars of the United States
Military equipment introduced in the 1990s